Rosetown is a town in the Canadian province of Saskatchewan, at the junction of provincial Highway 7 and Highway 4, approximately 115 km southwest of Saskatoon.

The town's motto, "The Heart of the Wheat Belt" reflects its history of being a farming community. It is the largest town located in the Rural Municipality St. Andrew's 287, Saskatchewan.

Rosetown belongs currently to the federal electoral district of Saskatoon—Rosetown—Biggar which was formerly known as Saskatoon—Rosetown. Rosetown belongs to census division 12 for purposes of enumerating the population which was 2,277 residents in 2006.

Rosetown won the 2004 Provincial Communities in Bloom.

History

On September 14, 1905, James and Anne Rose migrated from Lancashire, England, to an area of Saskatchewan, Canada. They were the first settlers in the area now known as Rosetown. Later, in 1907, a group of people from the area, wanting a post office, made an application for one. As a name had to be given to the post office, the group dedicated it to the town's most senior settlers, the Roses. As the name "Rose" was already taken, the group added "town" to it to create "Rosetown". The post office opened on September 7, 1907.

A Jewish colony was established near Rosetown after 1906.

Rosetown became a village on August 29, 1909, after Wilrod Bifair sold his homestead for $12 an acre to the Canadian Northern Railway. Village status was granted on August 4, 1909, when the population reached 500 people. W.G. King, W.R. Ferguson, and N.B. Douglas formed the village council in the same year. The first village council meeting was held on September 27, 1909. W.G. King established the first business in the village in 1909. Later that year he built three other stores at different locations.

Demographics 

Climate

Rosetown experiences a semi-arid climate (Köppen climate classification BSk). Precipitation is quite low, with the majority of it falling in the summer months.

Education
Walter Aseltine School is the elementary school in Rosetown named after a member of parliament Walter Aseltine. Rosetown Central High School provides secondary school education for Rosetown and surrounding rural areas. Both schools are part of the Sun West School Division. The Sun West School Division Office which provides education to west-central Saskatchewan is located in Rosetown.

Students in Kindergarten to Grade 6 attend Walter Aseltine School and Grades 7 to 12 attend the Rosetown Central High School. The average graduating class is 45-60 students depending on the year.

Prairie West Regional College provides post secondary education.

Media
Radio
1330 AM - CJYM, classic hits
104.9 FM - CKVX-FM, adult contemporary

Newspapers
Rosetown Eagle

Sports 
The Rosetown Red Wings of the Sask Valley Hockey League play out of SaskCan Centre.  They were formerly part of Allan Cup Hockey West.

Transportation
The first transportation was provided by a Red River Cart Trail called Old Bone Trail  as well as the historic Swift Current-Battleford Trail. The town grew in 1910 once the Canadian National Railway track reached Rosetown.
 
Rosetown Airport  is located near Rosetown. Both Highway 7 and Highway 4 serve vehicular traffic to and from Rosetown.

Notable people
 Lloyd Arntzen, musician, school teacher
 Walter Aseltine, PC, BA, QC was a Canadian parliamentarian and senator.
 Walter Farquharson, Moderator of the United Church of Canada
 Rob Friend, a former professional and Canadian international soccer player
 Randy Ireland, a Buffalo Sabres Goaltender
 Sherry Middaugh née Sherry Hamel, a Canadian curler.
 Robert (Bob) Ogle, a Roman Catholic priest, broadcaster and Member of the House of Commons of Canada.
 Jim Reiter, Canadian politician.
 Eldon Woolliams, an Alberta politician

See also
Sun West School Division
List of communities in Saskatchewan
List of rural municipalities in Saskatchewan

References

External links

 
Towns in Saskatchewan
Division No. 12, Saskatchewan